House of Elsevier may refer to:
 House of Elzevir, a Dutch printer of 17th and early 18th centuries
Elsevier, an information and analytics company established in 1880